Sahapur Harendranath Vidyapith School is a school located at Sahapur, New Alipore, Kolkata, India.

About School
This is a boys' school and is affiliated to the West Bengal Board of Secondary Education for Madhyamik Pariksha (10th Board exams), and to the West Bengal Council of Higher Secondary Education for Higher Secondary Examination (12th Board exams).

See also
Education in India
List of schools in India
Education in West Bengal

References

External links

Boys' schools in India
High schools and secondary schools in West Bengal
Schools in Kolkata
Educational institutions established in 1949
1949 establishments in West Bengal